Kani Siran (also Romanized as Kānī Sīrān) is a village in Behi Dehbokri Rural District, Simmineh District, Bukan County, West Azerbaijan Province, Iran. At the 2006 census, its population was 207, in 34 families.

References 

Populated places in Bukan County